Georges Perrin (18 April 1892 – 10 August 1969) was a French cyclist. He competed in three events at the 1908 Summer Olympics and two events at the 1920 Summer Olympics.

References

External links
 

1892 births
1969 deaths
French male cyclists
Olympic cyclists of France
Cyclists at the 1908 Summer Olympics
Cyclists at the 1920 Summer Olympics
People from Saumur
Sportspeople from Maine-et-Loire
Cyclists from Pays de la Loire